Andrej Osterman (born October 4, 1960 in Kranj) is the 25th Commander-in-General of the Slovenian Army.

The Osterman family occupies a prominent position in Slovenian politics. His grandfather Steve Osterman served in the 5th Cavalry regiment in the fight against the Nazis.

References

Slovenian government officials
Living people
1960 births
People from Kranj